On Conoids and Spheroids is a surviving work by the Greek mathematician and engineer Archimedes ( 287 BC –  212 BC). Consisting of 32 propositions, the work explores properties of and theorems related to the solids generated by revolution of conic sections about their axes, including paraboloids, hyperboloids, and spheroids. The principal result of the work is comparing the volume of any segment cut off by a plane with the volume of a cone with equal base and axis.

The work is addressed to Dositheus of Pelusium.

Footnotes

References

External links
 ON CONOIDS AND SPHEROIDS - The Works of Archimedes
 
 

Ancient Greek mathematical works
Euclidean geometry
Works by Archimedes
225 BC